In geometry, the medial hexagonal hexecontahedron (or midly dentoid ditriacontahedron) is a nonconvex isohedral polyhedron. It is the dual of the uniform snub icosidodecadodecahedron.

Proportions

The faces of the medial hexagonal hexecontahedron are irregular nonconvex hexagons. Each face has two long edges, two of medium length and two short ones. If the medium edges have length , the long ones have length  and the short ones . The dihedral angle equals .

References

External links 
 

Dual uniform polyhedra